is a former Japanese football player.

References

External links
 
 j-league
 

1991 births
Living people
Association football people from Miyazaki Prefecture
Japanese footballers
J2 League players
Japan Football League players
Kataller Toyama players
Kamatamare Sanuki players
Association football midfielders